Kooddoo Airport  is a domestic airport. It is located on the island of Kooddoo in Gaafu Alifu Atoll in the Maldives. It was opened on 10 September 2012 by President Mohamed Waheed Hassan.

Airlines and destinations

See also
 List of airports in the Maldives
 List of airlines of the Maldives

References

External links
 Aeronautical chart at SkyVector

Airports in the Maldives
Airports established in 2012